Swindon Designer Outlet is a covered designer outlet in Swindon, England.

The outlet occupies the restored Great Western railway works and is owned by McArthurGlen. Built by Tarmac Construction and opened in March 1997, it is located a few miles from junction 16 of the M4 motorway.

In the eating area, a number of steam locomotives that were built at Swindon Works have been on display:
3440 City of Truro until May 1999
4930 Hagley Hall from May 1999 until June 2007
7819 Hinton Manor from June 2007 until August 2018
7821 Ditcheat Manor since August 2018

References

External links
Official website

Buildings and structures in Swindon
Outlet malls in England
Shopping centres in Wiltshire
Shopping malls established in 1997
1997 establishments in England